Sandown-Shanklin was an urban district on the Isle of Wight, England, from 1933.  It was created by the merger of Shanklin and Sandown urban districts along with part of Isle of Wight Rural District. It was abolished in 1974 under the Local Government Act 1972, to form part of the South Wight district.

References

Districts of England abolished by the Local Government Act 1972
History of the Isle of Wight
Urban districts of England